Reda Caire (real name: Joseph Gandhour) (1908–1963) was a popular singer of operettes in Paris in the 1930s and 1950s.

Gandhour was born in Cairo, Egypt in 1908. He took his stage name from his hometown. He starred in the movie, L'enfant de minuit.

During the Second World War, he was accused of being Jewish. He was gay, though closeted.

He was buried in Saint-Zacharie, France in 1963.

References

Egyptian emigrants to France
Musicians from Paris
French LGBT singers
Egyptian LGBT singers
1908 births
1963 deaths
20th-century Egyptian male singers
Gay singers
20th-century French male opera singers
20th-century French LGBT people